Blonde Woman with Bare Breasts is a painting by Édouard Manet, executed c. 1878, now in the Musée d'Orsay in Paris. Contrary to its title, it shows a brunette.

References

1878 paintings
Paintings by Édouard Manet
Paintings in the collection of the Musée d'Orsay